This is a list of the Wildlife Refuges of the LCRV, namely the Lower Colorado River Valley, from the vicinity of Yuma, Arizona/San Luis Rio Colorado, Sonora to Lake Mead/Hoover Dam, and the environs of Laughlin, Nevada/Las Vegas, Nevada.

 Bill Williams River National Wildlife Refuge
 Cibola National Wildlife Refuge
 Havasu National Wildlife Refuge
 Imperial National Wildlife Refuge
 Kofa National Wildlife Refuge

See also
List of National Wildlife Refuges

'
'